Samet may refer to:

 Samet (name)
 Samet, Buriram, a subdistrict in Thailand
 Samad, a Semitic name rendered as Samet in Turkish
 Ko Samet, one of the Eastern Seaboard Islands of Thailand